Palatogobius is a genus of gobies native to the western Atlantic Ocean.

Species
There are currently three recognized species in this genus:
 Palatogobius grandoculus D. W. Greenfield, 2002
 Palatogobius incendius Tornabene, Robertson & Baldwin, 2017
 Palatogobius paradoxus C. R. Gilbert, 1971 (Mauve goby)

References

Gobiidae